Peñagrande is a neighborhood to the north of Madrid's city centre, in the district of Fuencarral-El Pardo. Peñagrande is Madrid's 26th largest neighborhood in terms of land area, its 10th largest in population and 77th largest in population density.

Statistics
Land area: 288.73 hectares
Population: 44.262 (2017)
Population density: 153.3 inhabitants per hectare

Transportation
Line 7 of the Metro Madrid is the only one giving service to the neighbourhood. The current metro stations are Lacoma, Avenida de la Ilustración and Peñagrande.

References

Wards of Madrid
Fuencarral-El Pardo